Metallica is an American heavy metal band formed in Los Angeles, California, in 1981. The band released its debut album Kill 'Em All in 1983, which credited songwriting between frontman James Hetfield, drummer Lars Ulrich and guitarist Dave Mustaine, who had left before the album was recorded (bassist Cliff Burton was credited for the bass solo "(Anesthesia) – Pulling Teeth"). On the 1984 follow-up Ride the Lightning, Burton received more songwriting credits and Mustaine's replacement Kirk Hammett was also co-credited on four songs. Master of Puppets, released in 1986, was the last album to feature Burton, who died in a bus accident later that year.

After bringing in Jason Newsted to replace Burton, Metallica released the extended play (EP) The $5.98 E.P. - Garage Days Re-Revisited in 1987, which featured cover versions of songs by Diamond Head, Holocaust, Killing Joke, Budgie and Misfits. The band's first studio album with Newsted, ...And Justice for All, was released the following year; the bassist was credited on one song only, opener "Blackened". In 1991 the self-titled Metallica was released, which is considered to be the band's mainstream breakthrough album. Load and Reload followed in 1996 and 1997, respectively. The year after Reload, Metallica released Garage Inc., a double album of cover versions.

After Newsted left in 2001, the bass on 2003's St. Anger was performed by producer Bob Rock, who was also credited with co-writing all of the songs. Robert Trujillo replaced Newsted later that year. Death Magnetic was released in 2008, which was the first to feature Trujillo on bass; all songs were credited as being written by all four band members. Unused recordings from the album's sessions were later released in the form of the EP Beyond Magnetic. In 2011, Metallica released the album Lulu in collaboration with Lou Reed. The band's tenth studio album, Hardwired... to Self-Destruct, was released in November 2016; it was written almost entirely by Hetfield and Ulrich, with Trujillo being co-credited on one song ("ManUNkind") and Hammett receiving no writing credits.

Songs

See also
List of Metallica demos

Footnotes

References

External links
List of Metallica songs at the band's official website
List of Metallica songs at AllMusic

Metallica